Baisogala Manor is a former residential manor in Baisogala town, Radviliškis district. During Soviet Union occupation years it was used as an administrative building of Institute of Animal. The manor was reconstructed in 2008.

References

Manor houses in Lithuania
Gothic Revival architecture in Lithuania